A list of films produced in Spain in 1985 (see 1985 in film).

1985

References

External links
 Spanish films of 1985 at the Internet Movie Database

1985
Spanish
Films